Autostraddle is an independently owned online magazine and social network for lesbian, bisexual, and queer women (cis and trans), as well as non-binary people and trans people of all genders. The website is a "politically progressive queer feminist media source" that features content covering LGBT and feminist news, politics, opinion, culture, arts and entertainment as well as lifestyle content such as DIY crafting, sex, relationships, fashion, food and technology.

Autostraddle was founded in 2009 by Riese Bernard, the current CEO and CFO, and former Design Director Alexandra Vega. In June 2020, Kamala Puligandla succeeded Bernard as editor-in-chief. In June 2021, Carmen Phillips was named the new editor-in-chief.

The site received 400,000 unique visitors and 2 million views per month in 2012. In 2016 these numbers had risen to one million unique visitors and 3.5 million views per month. In 2023, the site received 2.5 million unique views per month. The website received GLAAD's Outstanding Blog Award in 2015, and was nominated in 2013, 2014, and 2018.

History 
Riese Bernard founded Autostraddle in March 2009 with Alexandra Vega, the website's former Design Director. She wanted to create a website for queer women that was unlike other sites that existed at the time. The senior team consists of Riese Bernard, Laneia Jones, Carmen Philips, Kayla Kumari Upadhyaya, Nicole Hall, Heather Hogan, and Viv Le.

Revenue and funding 
In an article for Nylon Magazine, founder Riese Bernard discussed Autostraddle's alternative revenue strategies in the context of the rapid disintegration of queer women-oriented publications and online spaces. She has noted that advertisers largely do not buy ad space on the website. Autostraddle's funding model relies heavily on memberships, merchandise, and community fundraising.

Content 

Autostraddle publishes content on relationship dynamics, radical queer politics, economic injustice, among other things. In 2019, Riese Bernard and Buffering the Vampire Slayer'''s Kristin Russo started To L and Back, a podcast recapping every single episode of The L Word in order, one by one. Filmmaker Carly Usdin took over for Russo as co-host starting in season 2, and the show began featuring regular special guests.

 Queer Girl City Guides 
As part of their travel section, Autostraddle began publishing Queer Girl City Guides in 2012. Queer Girl City Guides are user-created, Autostraddle-approved guides to cities in the United States and abroad for queer women moving to or traveling to a new city. The guides discuss places to dance, eat, drink, be entertained, party, play sports, get an "alternative lifestyle haircut" or tattoo, celebrate pride, purchase LGBTQ books and publications, participate in activism, and more. The guides also provide insight on local colleges, gayborhoods and neighborhoods or places to avoid. Some guides also include sections on trans culture.

 Events 
Autostraddle hosts in-person events such as  "Holigay Meet-Ups" and its Pride Meet-Up Month, which are organized by users with Autostraddle's support and promotion. Autostraddle also offers ideas, tips, and resources for hosting a meet-up.

 A-Camp 
In April 2012, the first A-Camp was held as a pilot at Alpine Meadows Retreat Center in Angelus Oaks, California, where 163 queer campers and 35 staff members attended. A-Camps include various panels, workshops, discussion groups, classes, entertainment and other activities. Subsequent A-Camps have been larger, with between 300–400 campers in attendance per camp, including staff, and have taken place in the same location in California in September 2012, May 2013, October 2013, May 2014, May 2015 and June 2016. A-Camp took place in Wisconsin in October 2016 and May 2017, and the event moved to Ojai, California in May 2018.

Special guests at A-Camp have included Mary Lambert, Cameron Esposito, River Butcher, Julie Goldman, Brandy Howard, Be Steadwell, Mara Wilson, Gabe Dunn, DeAnne Smith, Hannah Hart, Somer Bingham, Lex Kennedy, Megan Benton, Mal Blum, Dan Owens-Reid, Kristin Russo, Jasika Nicole, Jenny Owen Youngs, Julia Nunes, Brittani Nichols, Mollie Thomas, Haviland Stillwell, Ashley Reed, and Sarah Croce. WNYC's podcast Nancy'' featured A-Camp in the episode "Kathy Goes to Camp".

Accolades 
In the 2012 Weblog Awards, Autostraddle was awarded Best Weblog of The Year, Best Group/Community Weblog and Best Entertainment Weblog. Autostraddle was nominated for GLAAD's Outstanding Blog Award in 2013, 2014, and 2018, and won in 2015. One of their articles,"105 Trans Women On American TV: A History and Analysis" by Riese Bernard, was nominated for a GLAAD Media Award in the category of Outstanding Digital Journalism in 2017.

See also 

 Daughters of Bilitis
 Homosocialization
 The Ladder (magazine)

References

External links
 Official website

Lesbian-related magazines
Lesbian-related websites
LGBT-related magazines published in the United States
LGBT-related mass media in the United States
LGBT-related websites
Magazines established in 2009
Online magazines published in the United States
Queer women's culture